Aliabad-e Kashantu (also Romanized as ‘Alīābād-e Kāshāntū) is a village in Cham Chamal Rural District, Bisotun District, Harsin County, Kermanshah Province, Iran. At the 2006 census, its population was 81, in 20 families.

References 

Populated places in Harsin County